The Pleasure Beach Great Yarmouth is an amusement park located in the seaside resort town of Great Yarmouth, Norfolk, on the English east coast. It opened in 1909. The largest and most popular ride at the park is the wooden Roller Coaster which opened in 1932. There are also around thirty other large rides at the park, as well as children's entertainment, amusement arcades, catering facilities, sweet shops and ice cream parlours.

History
In 1909 Charles B. Cochran applied to the local council to lease an area of sand dunes on the beach to develop an amusement park. His application was successful and sand dunes south of Nelson's Gardens were let to Cochran on which he constructed a L. A. Thompson scenic railway to the designs of William Napier. The Scenic Railway opened on 24 July 1909 along with the Katzenjammer Castle, which was a funhouse style attraction. The following year, the Scenic Railway was clad in plaster sculpted to resemble mountainous terrain and decorated with lights, as was common for such rides at the time. A new ride, The River Caves, also opened. The park operated at a modest level until the outbreak of World War I, after which lease of the site passed to John Henry Iles.

Iles had secured the rights to construct L. A. Thompson's scenic railway rides in Britain, and the Scenic Railway at Pleasure Beach at the time was one of Iles's rides. Unfortunately, it was extensively damaged by fire in April 1919 and a large section of the track and support structure was destroyed. The ride was quickly rebuilt however and opened later that same year. Under Iles's management, the site expanded throughout the 1920s to encompass much of the area still used today. A variety of rides were installed, including Jack and Jill, Noah's Ark and Over The Falls. In 1925, a huge water chute was installed, which operated until 1928. Iles's lease of the site expired at the end of 1928 and the Council favoured an application for lease from showman Pat Collins. Iles removed his Scenic Railway and his involvement in the site came to an end.

Pat Collins' son John was appointed to oversee day-to-day operation of the park. The Collins' installed a Figure 8 roller coaster and the prototype circular water chute, which had been designed by German showman Hugo Haase, both of which opened in 1929. In 1931 Pat and John visited the Colonial Exhibition in Paris where there was an amusement park among the attractions. The largest ride there was a scenic railway operated by Hugo Haase, who the Collins's had recently done business with. At the close of the Exhibition, Collins purchased the ride for Pleasure Beach and it was dismantled, shipped to England and erected in the park. The ride, now called Roller Coaster, opened on 14 May 1932 and has been operational since. It remains the most popular ride at Pleasure Beach and it is now a rare example of the scenic railway design of roller coaster - being one of only two such rides left in the UK (the other being the Scenic Railway at Dreamland Amusement Park, Margate) and one of only seven in the world. In common with most scenic railways, a 'brakeman' is required to ride with the train to control its speed and to stop it at the end of the ride, as there are no brakes on the track.

By the 1950s, John Collins had endeavors elsewhere and could not commit the time to Pleasure Beach it needed. He sublet the site to Botton Brothers Limited ahead of the 1954 season. This was a company formed by brothers Albert and James Botton, who had operated various rides and attractions at travelling fairs and static parks around the south-east of England since 1942. Albert Botton moved to Great Yarmouth to oversee day-to-day operation of the park and a policy of annual improvement commenced. Some of the rides that were at the Pleasure Beach during this time included The Jets, Satellite, Paratrooper, Sky Wheels and Swirl. Botton Brothers also installed their Gallopers near the entrance to Pleasure Beach in 1954 and this ride remains there today.

Albert Botton died in 1975 and management of the park passed to Jimmy Jones, who had married Albert and his wife Lottie's daughter, Jane Botton. Jimmy Jones was managing director throughout the rest of the 1970s and 1980s. In 1982, the pop group Madness recorded scenes for their music video for their song "House of Fun" at Pleasure Beach. In 1992 the various Botton Brothers companies were amalgamated into one company called Pleasure & Leisure Corporation PLC and freehold of the Pleasure Beach site was purchased at the end of 1993. At this time, Jimmy Jones ceded the role of managing director to his son Albert Jones. The Pleasure Beach Gardens opened in 1996. The Gardens are advertised as a place to relax away from the noise and excitement of the main park. The Gardens include Sara's Tearooms, a themed miniature golf course, refreshment kiosk, junior go karts, Jurassic Gardens and an Upside Down House.

Current operation
Pleasure & Leisure Corporation PLC were one of two applicants to reach the final stage in bidding for the large casino licence which was granted to Great Yarmouth Borough Council in 2007. The proposal for a complex called 'The Edge', to comprise a cinema, bowling alley, Premier Inn hotel and Beefeater restaurant, to be built on land south of the Pleasure Beach site, was accepted. However, the project was beset by various delays and ultimately significantly scaled back to remove the casino. An 81 bedroom Premier Inn hotel and a Beefeater restaurant, along with a new car park, opened in June 2019.

The company operating Pleasure Beach became a limited company in 2020. Managing director Albert Jones is assisted by his sons Jamie and Aaron Jones, who are also directors, and the third generation of Jones's to operate the park. Pleasure Beach continued operating during 2020 and 2021, despite concerns for closure due to the impact of the COVID-19 pandemic on tourism. New events, such as Coaster Cabana and Fairground Frights have proven popular and won awards. New rides are regularly added, including two new rides for 2022.

Current large rides and attractions

See also
 List of British Theme Parks

References

External links

 Great Yarmouth Pleasure Beach Official Site

Amusement parks in England
1887 establishments in England
Tourist attractions in Norfolk
Great Yarmouth